The Barbier-Mueller Museum, founded in 1977, is located at 10 rue Jean-Calvin, in Geneva, Switzerland. Its  collection contains over 7,000 pieces and includes works of art from Tribal and Classical antiquity as well as sculptures, fabrics and ornaments from "primitive" civilizations around the world. Its goal is to preserve, study, and publish the collection begun by Josef Müller in 1907 and carried on by his daughter Monique and son-in-law Jean Paul Barbier-Mueller.

The museum has gained international acclaim through itinerant exhibitions, the loans to other museums, and the publication of numerous catalogues and art books.

Twenty years later, in 1997, the Museu Barbier-Mueller d'Art Precolombí was inaugurated in Barcelona, Spain. It is located in the Nadal Palace, opposite to the Picasso Museum, in Montcada Street.

Further reading
 The Kalasan Batak in North Sumatra, an Unknown Group. Jean Paul Barbier-Mueller: Musée Barbier-Mueller, Geneva 2011, .
 The Sacred, the Secret. On the Man, the Mona and the Koyaka of Côte d'Ivoire. Alain-Michel Boyer: Musée Barbier-Mueller, Geneva 2011, . 
 The Gan of Burkina Faso. Reconstitution of the History and Symbolics of a Little-Known Kingdom. Daniela Bagnolo: Musée Barbier-ueller, Geneva 2010, .
Icons in gold : jewelry of India from the collection of the Musée Barbier-Mueller ; Laurence Mattet;  Usha R Bala Krishnan;  Musée Barbier-Mueller.;  Standard Bank Centre Art Gallery.;  Gold of Africa Museum.;  Durban Art Gallery. Paris : Somogy Art Publishers ; Geneva : Musée Barbier-Mueller, 2005. .
Arts of the South Seas : island Southeast Asia, Melanesia, Polynesia, Micronesia ; the collections of the Musée Barbier-Mueller ; Douglas Newton;  Musée Barbier-Mueller ; Munich ; New York : Prestel, 1999. .

References
Barbier-Mueller Museum Official website.

See also
 The Ann and Gabriel Barbier-Mueller Museum of samurai armor, Dallas, Texas

Art museums and galleries in Switzerland
Former private collections
Museums in Geneva
Art museums established in 1977
1977 establishments in Switzerland